The Oriente cave rat (Boromys offella) is an extinct species of rodent in the family Echimyidae. It was endemic to Cuba.
Its natural habitat was subtropical or tropical moist lowland forests.  It is known from recent fossil records, and may have become extinct with the introduction of other rats.

References

Boromys
Rodent extinctions since 1500
Mammals described in 1916
Taxonomy articles created by Polbot
Extinct animals of Cuba
Mammals of the Caribbean
Endemic fauna of Cuba